William Leslie "Crip" Golightly (February 19, 1900 – September 3, 1974) was a college basketball head coach.

Texas Tech
Golightly coached the Texas Tech Matadors basketball team (now known as the Red Raiders) during the 1930–31 season. His record with the team is 11–9. Golightly also served as an assistant football coach at Texas Tech under Pete Cawthon during the 1930 season.

References

1900 births
1974 deaths
American men's basketball coaches
Basketball coaches from Texas
Texas Tech Red Raiders basketball coaches
Texas Tech Red Raiders football coaches